George Paterson Miller (21 November 1894 – 16 February 1939) was a Scottish professional footballer who played as a forward, primarily with Heart of Midlothian.

Club career
Miller was born in Edinburgh and began his football career playing with leading local amateur club Civil Service Strollers whilst training as a law clerk. He then moved on to Tranent of the Junior grade, and represented Scotland at that level in three matches.

He was signed by Hearts in 1915, aged 20 – at his own request, he had an amateur contract in order for him to continue training as a solicitor. By this time World War I was in its second year, and the conflict had a huge impact on Hearts when most of their players enlisted en masse and several were later killed in action.

The Scottish League continued to operate during the war, and Miller replaced Harry Wattie (also a product of Tranent, who was one of the players training for the Western Front and who would ultimately perish at the Battle of the Somme). In one of Miller's first appearances in October 1915, Hearts lost 5–0 at home to Ayr United; however in the very next match they defeated Rangers 4–0 at Ibrox Park with Willie Wilson scoring a hat-trick.

From 1916 Miller served in the 9th Royal Scots Regiment and was promoted to Sergeant. He continued to appear for Hearts when home on leave. At the conclusion of the hostilities in 1918 Miller returned to Edinburgh and was in the Hearts side which was a finalist in the 1919 Victory Cup, and that season he also appeared once for Scotland in one of the unofficial Victory Internationals.

Miller continued to play regularly for Hearts until April 1922 when he found the football was conflicting with his legal career, which he did not wish to give up to turn professional. He was then signed by Raith Rovers in summer 1922, aged 28, to play for them while continuing as a solicitor in Edinburgh. This suited both parties until Raith requested all their players to be based near Kirkcaldy which did not suit Miller's other work commitments.

In January 1925 he was re-signed by Hearts for a fee of £1,200, going on to spend six further seasons at Tynecastle before retiring in 1931, aged 36, having made 243 appearances for Hearts (46 goals) in major competitions over his two spells.

He died of a heart attack in 1939 at the age of 44.

References

External links
Pen Portrait of Miller, 1918
Pen Portrait of Miller, 1925

1894 births
1939 deaths
Royal Scots soldiers
Footballers from Edinburgh
Scottish footballers
British Army personnel of World War I
Scottish lawyers
Scottish Football League players
Raith Rovers F.C. players
Heart of Midlothian F.C. players
Tranent Juniors F.C. players
Association football forwards
Scotland wartime international footballers
Scotland junior international footballers
Scottish Junior Football Association players
Civil Service Strollers F.C players